Millennium is a 1989 science fiction film directed by Michael Anderson and starring Kris Kristofferson, Cheryl Ladd, Robert Joy, Brent Carver, Al Waxman and Daniel J. Travanti. The original score was composed by Eric N. Robertson. It was marketed with the tagline "The people aboard Flight 35 are about to land 1,000 years from where they planned to."

Millennium is based on the 1977 short story "Air Raid" by John Varley. Varley started work on a screenplay in 1979, and released the expanded story in book-length form in 1983 as Millennium.

The film follows an air crash investigator who discovers curiously strange details while investigating a recent crash.  A woman is sent back to his time from the future to try and derail his investigation before he uncovers their secret.

Plot 
In 1989, while on its landing approach, a U.S. commercial jet is about to be struck by another plane from above. The pilot struggles to control the plane while the first officer checks the passenger cabin. He returns to the cockpit yelling that everyone is dead and the corpses are burned.

National Transportation Safety Board investigator Bill Smith investigates the accident. He and his team are confused by the first officer's words on the cockpit voice recorder, as there is no evidence of a fire before the crash. Meanwhile, theoretical physicist Dr. Arnold Mayer is professionally curious about the crash, which borders on science fiction. In a lecture, he discusses the possibility of visits from time travelers.

In the future, pollution has rendered humans unable to reproduce. Teams are sent into the past to abduct people who are about to die; the plane crashes were part of this plan. The abductees are kept in stasis until they can be sent into the far future to repopulate the Earth. Most of the current population is in poor health but the time travelers—mostly women—are relatively healthy and are given the best food and care to pass for 20th-century humans. Present-day air is too clean for the time travelers to process; they smoke cigarettes to mimic their own timeline's atmosphere.

Every incursion into the past causes an accompanying "timequake", with a magnitude proportional to the incursion's effects. Time travelers try to minimize their effects by replacing the humans they abduct with organically grown copies. This explains the co-pilot's comment about the charred passengers; the replicas had been pre-burned in preparation for the crash.

In 1963, a time traveler on a plane is shot before it crashes, losing a stun weapon as a result. This weapon winds up in Dr. Mayer's possession, setting his path to investigate what is happening. Twenty-five years later, Smith finds a similar artifact among the wreckage of the crash portrayed at the beginning of the film.

Worried that the discoveries made by Smith and Mayer might change history, time-traveler Louise Baltimore is sent back to 1989 to deter Bill Smith from pursuing his investigation. She gains Bill's trust and seduces him into a one-night stand, attempting to distract him. Bill gradually becomes suspicious and visits Dr. Mayer. Louise materializes from the future and reveals her mission to them, hoping they will voluntarily keep the secret. During the conversation, Mayer accidentally kills himself while reassembling the stun weapon.

Mayer was instrumental in the development of the Gate technology that made time travel possible; his death results in an unsolvable paradox—a force infinity timequake—which will destroy the entire civilization of the future timeline. The only course of action is to send all the people who were collected into the distant future before the Gate is permanently destroyed.

Bill, and Louise, who is pregnant, step through the Gate together and disappear. As an explosion destroys the Gate and as the blast wave engulfs Louise's android advisor, Sherman, he quotes Winston Churchill: "This is not the end. This is not the beginning of the end. It is the end of the beginning."

Cast 
 Kris Kristofferson as Bill Smith
 Jamie Shannon as Young Bill Smith
 Cheryl Ladd as Louise Baltimore
 Daniel J. Travanti as Dr. Arnold Mayer
 Robert Joy as Sherman the Robot
 Lloyd Bochner as Walters
 Brent Carver as Coventry
 David McIlwraith as Tom Stanley
 Maury Chaykin as Roger Keane
 Al Waxman as Dr. Brindle
 Lawrence Dane as Captain Vern Rockwell
 Thomas Hauff as First Officer Ron Kennedy

Production 

Millennium took 10 years to reach the screen. One director initially attached was visual effects designer Douglas Trumbull; Paul Newman and Jane Fonda were proposed to play the leads. MGM was attached to make the film; they also had Trumbull's Brainstorm in production at the time. The death of Brainstorm'''s leading lady Natalie Wood led to MGM briefly pulling the plug on said film and thus halted production on Millennium due to Trumbull's involvement. The role of director then passed to Richard Rush, Alvin Rakoff, and Phillip Borsos, before Michael Anderson, best known for 1956's Oscar-winning Around the World in 80 Days, stepped in. Millennium's production designer, Gene Rudolf, had to produce a future setting that implied putrefaction and atrophy.

The largest set was the time-travel center for Louise Baltimore's operation. Rudolf created rusted catwalks that traversed a large open space. Buildings crumbled and exposed their infrastructures. The walls were painted dull green, black and coppery. Rudolf wanted the future to look dirty, sick and poisoned.

Several scenes are set in the vault for the decrepit council members overseeing the time travel operation. Rudolf designed their chamber as a semicircle of seven transparent, upright cylinders, each serving as a life-support device. Four of the cylinders held actors. The others were filled with bodily organ props and medical equipment that served as the last still living remnants of these members.

To create the time-travel effects of the Gate itself, cinematographer René Ohashi produced the ghostly shimmering lights by spinning metal wheels covered in Mylar.

Since actual aircraft could not be sent through the set, miniature models and a full-size mock-up of the tail-section of a Boeing 707 were used. Optical effects were used to make the planes look as if they were entering the set.

The penultimate scene took place in a contemporary American home. Rudolf's set was dominated by large horizontal windows. The room was filled with clocks, hourglasses and navigational equipment, in line with Dr. Arnold Mayer's fascination with time travel.

The scenes shot in the airport terminal buildings were actually shot at Toronto Lester B. Pearson International Airport, in the former Terminals 1 & 2. For the outdoor shot where Baltimore (Ladd) steals the car, two-way traffic was run in front of the Terminal 2 arrivals level where it is ordinarily a one-way road.

Reception
As of January 31, 2018, the film holds an 11% rating on review aggregator Rotten Tomatoes.

 Alternate endings 

The original North American theatrical and VHS release of the film features a close-up of Sherman as the gate explodes, followed by a shot of the sun rising over clouds.
  
The International theatrical release features a much wider shot of the gate's explosion, followed by a wormhole/time portal effect. The scene then dissolves into an underwater shot of the two main characters swimming from above, followed by a view of the characters in a nude, Eden-esque embrace.

The 1999 North American DVD release contains the International version of the ending. The simpler North American version can also be found on the DVD as a bonus feature on the last page of the Production Notes; the version of the movie available on Netflix uses the North American ending as well.

 Home media 
In February 2016, the film was released on Blu-ray by Shout! Factory in a double feature with R.O.T.O.R.''

References

External links 
 
 
 

1989 films
1980s science fiction films
1980s dystopian films
20th Century Fox films
American aviation films
American independent films
American science fiction films
1980s English-language films
Films about time travel
Films based on science fiction novels
Films based on short fiction
Films directed by Michael Anderson
Films scored by Eric Robertson (composer)
Films set in 1963
Films set in 1989
Films set on airplanes
Films shot in Toronto
Films set in Minnesota
1980s American films